The Pavelló de l'Espanya Industrial, currently named Centre Esportiu Municipal l'Espanya Industrial is a building located in Barcelona. Completed in 1991, it hosted the weightlifting competitions for the 1992 Summer Olympics.

References
1992 Summer Olympics official report.  Volume 2. pp. 196–9.

Venues of the 1992 Summer Olympics
Olympic weightlifting venues
Sports venues in Barcelona